Coniophanes andresensis, the San Andres snake, is a species of snake in the family Colubridae. The species is native to San Andrés of Colombia.

References

Coniophanes
Snakes of North America
Reptiles described in 1937
Endemic fauna of Colombia
Reptiles of Colombia